Black Widow, is a "Film Noir Musical" film written by David Mortin and Patricia Fogliato and directed by the former. It is loosely based on the trial of Evelyn Dick for the murder of her husband. The film stars Martin Tielli, Mary Margaret O'Hara and Sarah Slean as Eve Hardwick, the character that is based on Evelyn Dick.

Director David Mortin stated that he did not want to make the film into a biographical film, as that had already been done (referring to the 2002 crime thriller Torso: The Evelyn Dick Story), but instead, focus on "mythologizing the Evelyn Dick story, shaping it into the form of a 40's era film noir".

The film premiered on September 29, 2005, on the film festival circuit and on CBC Television in January 2006.

Plot summary
The film begins with a severed head that is just about to go up in flames when it starts to sing "Blue Prelude" by Nina Simone. The head then starts to tell the story of how it has wound up in this situation. He meets a beautiful dark-haired woman, a femme fatale, and he begins to fall in love with her the moment their eyes meet. Soon after, he learns that she should not be trusted but by then it is too late as he soon becomes entrapped in the charming predator's web of deception.

Cast

Production
Mortin claims that one of the hardest tasks was finding the perfect femme fatale to play Eve Hardwick. In the spring of 2004, he met Sarah Slean and Mortin was "blown away" by her music and her "inherent theatrically". He cast her in hoping that she would be able to portray the black widow. According to Mortin, Sarah seemed very nervous at first on set. In his director's notes, he writes "[Sarah] tried on gown after gown under the lights and seemed to be growing increasingly uncomfortable - which made me feel very nervous as well. Then she tried on what we called the 'Gilda gown' - jet-black and shimmering with a life of its own. Suddenly her character, the period, the whole film noir world of BLACK WIDOW snapped into sharp focus for her. And for me too, because finally, our femme fatale was standing there before us, ready for her close up."

Awards and nominations

References

External links
 

2005 films
2000s mystery films
Canadian black-and-white films
Canadian serial killer films
English-language Canadian films
2000s musical films
Canadian musical drama films
2000s musical drama films
2005 drama films
2000s English-language films
2000s Canadian films